Flowamatic-9 is a compilation of previously released and remixed 3X Krazy songs compiled from their first EP, Sick-O, as well as various guest appearances. It was released on October 14, 2003 for RT Entertainment and featured production from Tone Capone, Rick Rock and E-A-Ski.

Track listing
"Intro" - 1:43
"Ho Fuckin Season" - 4:56
"Down Ass Niggas" - 5:00
"Smoked in the Hood" - 5:11
"Sick-O" - 5:32
"It Goes Down" - 5:17
"Sunshine" - 5:16
"Now You Know" - 4:12
"Murder Show" - 4:01
"Funk All Day" - 4:33
"Put Me to the Test" - 6:16
"Outro" - 0:40

3X Krazy albums
Albums produced by Rick Rock
2003 compilation albums
Gangsta rap compilation albums